Lisa Eyre (born 18 December 1968) is a British former rower. She competed at the 1996 Summer Olympics and the 2000 Summer Olympics.

References

External links
 

1968 births
Living people
British female rowers
Olympic rowers of Great Britain
Rowers at the 1996 Summer Olympics
Rowers at the 2000 Summer Olympics
People from Nantwich
World Rowing Championships medalists for Great Britain